Cerro Pintado is a mountain in South America.

See also
 List of Ultras of South America

References

External links
 

Pintado
Pintado
Pintado
Colombia–Venezuela border
Three-thousanders of the Andes